South Hill is a neighborhood in Minot, North Dakota, located south of the Souris River, above the Souris River Valley. It is a primarily residential neighborhood, although there are commercial zones along South Broadway, Twentieth Avenue South and around the Dakota Square Mall.

Geography

South Hill is located south of the Souris River Valley. The neighborhood is bound by the Souris River Valley to the north and the city limits on the east, south and west. The major streets through South Hill include Sixteenth Street Southwest, Thirty-Seventh Avenue South, North Broadway and the Bypass, which carries US 52, US 2 and US 83 around Minot. All the streets in Minot are gridded, based on the intersection of Central Avenue and Main Street downtown. All of the roads in South Hill are south of Central Avenue. Main Street in South Hill divides streets east and west. There are numerous small neighborhoods within South Hill, which usually take their names from the original developments built there. Neighborhoods in South Hill east of Broadway include Anthony Hill, Charlesbois, Warrendale and Woodridge. Neighborhoods in South Hill west of Broadway include Brooklyn, Dakota Square and Southwest Minot.

Economy

Top employers

The top employers on South Hill, according to the Minot Area Development Corporation in the first quarter of 2013 are:

Attractions

Dakota Square Mall
Lucy's Amusement Park
Maysa Arena
Scandinavian Heritage Park
Town and Country Shopping Center

Parks and recreation

Bicentennial Park
Milla Vista Park
Radio City Park
South Hill Baseball Complex

Education

Minot High School's Magic City Campus is located in the South Hill neighborhood on Eleventh Avenue SW. The building was constructed in 1973 and is home to the juniors and seniors in the Minot District school system. Edison Elementary School, Jim Hill Middle School and Washington Elementary School are also located in South Hill. The North Dakota State University North Central Research Extension Center is located on Broadway, less than a mile south of the city limits.

Transportation
The main roads accessing South Hill are the Broadway and the Bypass. The Bypass has exits for South Hill at Broadway, Sixteenth Street SW and Tenth Street SW (eastbound only).

Bus service
 Minot City Transit operates several bus routes, which serve South Hill on weekdays. Cash fare or tokens can be purchased upon boarding the bus. The South #1 Route in the morning connects Edison Elementary School, Minot High School's Magic City Campus, the Town and Country Shopping Center, Warrendale, Washington Elementary School and Woodridge. The South #2 Route connects downtown with the Dakota Square Mall, Edison Elementary and the Magic City Campus in South Hill. The Washington Route in the morning connects Anthony Hill, Charlebois, Edison Elementary School, Warrendale, Washington Elementary School and Woodridge. The South #1 Route in the afternoon connects downtown with Brooklyn, Edison Elementary School, Jim Hill Middle School, Town and Country Shopping Center, Warrendale and Washington Elementary School in South Hill. The South #2 Route connects the Town and Country Shopping Center with Southwest Minot. The South #3 Route in the afternoon connects the Town and Country Shopping Center with the Dakota Square Mall, Edgewood Vista and the South Hill Softball Complex. The West Route in the afternoon connects Town and Country Shopping Center in South Hill with downtown, Minot State University, Oak Park and Spring Lake in the Souris Valley. The North Route in the afternoon connects the Town and Country Center in South Hill with downtown, Minot State University and North Hill.

Future development
Several housing developments are underway throughout South Hill. A number of hotels and retail develops are also underway in the South Hill neighborhood, especially along South Broadway and Sixteenth Street Southwest. In March 2013, a Kohl's department store opened in South Hill.  A Home Depot store is also planned to open on South Broadway in 2014.  Several hotels and restaurants are also being constructed near the intersection of Sixteenth and Thirty-Seventh Avenue SW. There have been plans discussed for a South Bypass in South Hill that would carry traffic from US 2 and US 52 from the east to points south and west of the city.

Events
Arts in the Park, summer, Scandinavian Heritage Park
Integrity Jazz Festival, July, Scandinavian Heritage Park
Midsummer Night Festival, June, Scandinavian Heritage Park
WhyNotFest, August, Downtown Minot

References

Neighborhoods in North Dakota
Neighborhoods in Minot, North Dakota